Haseena Haneef, better known as Usha N (her stage name), is an Indian actress, who has worked predominantly in Malayalam film industry. She has acted in more than 70 movies.
Usha made her acting debut as a child artist in the 1984 film Nokkethadhoorathu Kannum Nattu.

Biography

Usha is an Indian actress and singer in Malayalam movies. She has acted in more than 70 movies, and is also a dancer and singer.

Personal life

She was born as Haseena to Muhammed Haneef, an A.S.I. and Hafsa Beevi, at Alisherry, Alappuzha, Kerala. She has two brothers; Haseeb and Hanees, both of whom are in the film industry.  She had her primary education from Govt. Mohammedan's Higher Secondary School, Alappuzha. She was a theatre artist before becoming a cine artist. She debuted as a heroine to Balachandra Menon in the movie Kandathum Kettathum in 1988. Later in 2011, she married Nazar Abdul Khader, a Chennai-based businessman.

Partial filmography

Nokkethadhoorathu Kannum Nattu (1984) as Child Artist in Song "Lathiri Poothiri Punchiri Cheppo"
Kandathum Kettathum (1988) as Muthu Lekshmi 
Aattinakkare (1989) as Sindhu
Annakutty Kodambakkam Vilikkunnu (1989) as Ponnammma
Carnival (1989) as Vanaja
Kireedam (1989) as Latha
Varnnam (1989) as Ammu's friend
Vadakkunokkiyantram (1989) as Thankamani
Eenam Maranna Kattu (1989) 
Ammayude Swantham Kunju Mary (1990) as Jessy
Ponnaranjaanam (1990) as Savithri, Ponnu
Thoovalsparsham (1990) as Indu
Kottayam Kunjachan (1990) as Susie
Arhatha (1990) as Sindhu
Anantha Vruthantham (1990) as Vijayalakshmi
Pavam Pavam Rajakumaran (1990) as Uma
Apoorvam Chilar (1991) as Hema
Koodikazhcha (1991) as Annie
Ulsavamelam (1992) as Ashwathy
Aadhaaram (1992) as Shahida
Mithunam (1993) as Shyama
Sthreedhanam (1993) as Vanaja
Chenkol (1993) as Latha
Thalamura (1993) as Malu 
Naalai Engal Kalyanam (1993)  - Tamil film as Shembakam
Vardhakya Puranam (1994) as Mollykutty
Kudumba Vishesham (1994) as Vidya
Bheesmacharya (1994) as Sathi
Malappuram Haji Mahanaya Joji (1994) as Premalatha
Vadhu Doctoranu (1994) as Nirmala
Kadal (1994) as Ammini
Chaithanyam (1995)
Thovalapookkal (1995) as Shobha
Avittam Thirunaal Aarogya Sriman (1995) as Jalaja
Street (1995) as Kanakam
Guru Shishyan (1997) as Sumathi
Ancharakalyanam (1997) as Susheela
Vamsam (1997) as Alice 
Ikkareyanente Manasam (1997) as Malathi
Adukkala Rahasyam Angaadi Paattu (1997) as Janna
Varnapakittu (1997) as Tonichen's wife
Ullasapoongattu (1997) as Maya's sister
Draavidan (1998) as Treesa
Oro Viliyum Kathorthu (1998) as Snehalatha
Mayajalam (1998) as Servant
Panchaloham (1998) as Sulochana
Captain (1999) as Kasthuri
Ennum Sambhavami Yuge Yuge (2001) as Shantha
Akhila (2002) as Bindhu
Nakshathrakkannulla Rajakumaran Avanundoru Rajakumari (2002) as Cheeru
Www.anukudumbam.com (2002) as Susheela Duttan
Guda (2003)
Nomparam (2005) as Devu
Achanurangatha Veedu (2006) as Lillykutty
Vaasthavam (2006) as Shubha
Avan Chandiyude Makan (2007) as Kochurani
Athisayan (2007) as Koshy's wife
Bullet (2008) as Maheswari
Chempada (2008) as Gomathi
Twenty:20 (2008) as Latha
Decent Parties (2009) 
Cheriya Kallanum Valiya Policum (2010) as Padmini
Advocate Lakshmanan - Ladies Only (2010) as Pankajavally 
Sura (2010)  as Poornima's mother - Tamil film
Njaan Sanchaari (2010) as Ashokan's wife
Ajantha (2012)
Ithu Manthramo Thanthramo Kuthanthramo (2013)
Pigman (2013) as Sreekumar's sister
God's Own Country (2014) as Muhammed's wife
Oru Manjukalathinte Ormakkai (2014) as Anitta
Sivapuram (2016) 
Karutha Joothan (2017) 
Achayans (2017) as Jessica's mother
Aakashamittayee (2017) as Palani's wife
Lolans (2018) as Leona's mother
My Great Grandfather (2019) as Cameo
Azhakode Alappuzha (2022) - Short film
Badarul Muneer Husnul Jamal
Jannath 
Mittayi Theruvu
Cheena Trophy (2022) as Usha
Adiyanthravasthakalathe Pranayam (2022)

Television serials
 Adutha Bellodu Koodi Nadakam Aarambhikkum
 Arabikadalinte Rani
 Kaathirunna Kannukal
 Kooman Kolli
 Katha Parayunna Kannukal
 Tharavum Ponmuttaym (DD Malayalam)
 1999 - Krishnathulasi
 2002 - Vasundhara Medicals (Asianet)
 2005 - Alilathali (Surya TV)
 2006- Sthreethwam Surya TV
 2007- Nandhanam- Surya TV
 2010 - Indraneelam (Surya TV)
 2013 - Nilapakshi (Kairali TV)
 2016 - Jagratha (Amrita TV)
 2018 - Bhagyajathakam (Mazhavil Manorama)

Other information
Besides acting in films she has acted in some television serials including Nilapakshi, a telefilm called Nanmayude Nakshathrangal, and in reality shows Tharotsavam and Nakshathradeepangal on Kairali TV. She also appeared in TV Shows like Comedy Super Nite, Katha Ithuvare etc. She has acted in devotional albums like Devipooja.She has sung and featured in music videos like Punyangalude Pookkalam, Ee Kalavum Kadannu Pokum etc. She has also anchored a program called Business Talks for Kerala Vision.

References

External links

Usha at MSI
http://entertainment.oneindia.in/celebs/usha-malayalam-actress.html

Actresses in Malayalam cinema
Indian film actresses
Actresses from Alappuzha
Living people
20th-century Indian actresses
21st-century Indian actresses
Indian television actresses
Actresses in Malayalam television
Actresses in Tamil cinema
Year of birth missing (living people)